Huwaida Arraf (born February 1976) is a Palestinian American activist and lawyer who co-founded the International Solidarity Movement (ISM), a Palestinian-led organization using non-violent protests and international pressure to support Palestinians.

Early life and education
Arraf was born to two Palestinian Christian parents. Her mother is from the West Bank town of Beit Sahour and her father from Mi'ilya, a local council in Northern Israel. Under Israeli law, she has Israeli citizenship through her father, a Palestinian citizen of Israel. Her parents moved from the West Bank to Detroit, Michigan, Arraf's birthplace, to be able to raise her away from the violence in the West Bank. She and her parents were able to visit Israel every few years until Arraf was ten years old.

Arraf majored in Arabic and Judaic studies and political science at the University of Michigan. She spent a year at the Hebrew University in Jerusalem and studied Hebrew on a kibbutz. Arraf later earned a Juris Doctor from American University's Washington College of Law. Her focus was on international human rights and humanitarian law, with a particular interest in war crimes prosecution.

As a law student, Arraf conducted research for the Public International Law and Policy Group, which provides pro bono legal assistance to governments involved in conflicts. Arraf also worked with the International Human Rights Law Clinic at the Washington College of Law, where she represented clients before the Inter-American Commission on Human Rights on issues ranging from indigenous lands rights to cross-border abductions and irregular rendition.

Career
In the spring of 2000, Arraf traveled to Jerusalem to work as program coordinator for Seeds of Peace, a U.S.-based nonprofit organization that seeks to foster dialogue between Jewish and Palestinian youth.

In 2001, Arraf worked at the Center for Coexistence in Jerusalem as a regional coordinator.

International Solidarity Movement 
The International Solidarity Movement (ISM) is a Palestinian-led movement committed to resisting what it terms "the long-entrenched and systematic oppression and dispossession of the Palestinian population, using non-violent, direct-action methods and principles."

In April, 2001, while living in the occupied Palestinian territories, Arraf founded the ISM with members of two Palestinian foundations, the Holy Land Trust and the Rapprochement Centre, to focus international attention on the oppression of the Palestinians.

Since its creation, over 3,000 volunteers from dozens of countries have joined the ISM to monitor human rights abuses in occupied Palestine. In 2003 and 2004, the organization was nominated for the Nobel Peace Prize.

"The Palestinian Intifada, the ‘uprising for freedom,’ has got to be an international struggle. . .," Arraf says. "[It] is a struggle for freedom, a struggle for basic human dignity and human rights. Anyone who believes in freedom, believes in justice, believes in equality for all people not based on religion or nationality, can join in the struggle."

Arraf co-authored the book "Peace Under Fire: Israel, Palestine, and the International Solidarity Movement."

Gaza Freedom Flotilla 
Arraf was the chair of the Free Gaza Movement, the organization behind the Gaza Freedom Flotillas, a series of groups of ships carrying Pro-Palestinian activists that were organized to break Israel's naval blockade of the Gaza Strip. She was aboard the 2008 Free Gaza boats as well as the 2010 flotilla that was raided by Israeli commandos on May 31. Using a satellite phone on board, Arraf stated that their plan was to have the boats keep heading toward Gaza "until they either disable our boats or jump on board."

At the time of the raid, Arraf was aboard the Challenger 1, one of the smallest boats (30 feet) of the flotilla. On Thursday, 3 June 2010, she provided her version of the events on Challenger 1 in an interview on Democracy Now.

Arraf resigned from this position in October 2012 after a new board was approved on September 17, 2012,. Her resignation came shortly before a controversy over an allegedly anti-Semitic tweet posted by Greta Berlin on the official Twitter feed of the Free Gaza Movement. Arraf called Berlin's tweet "offensive" but declined to answer a question put to her by Avi Mayer, a staffer at the Jewish Agency for Israel, about whether her departure was related to it.

2022 congressional campaign 

In November 2021, Arraf declared her candidacy for Michigan's 10th congressional district in the 2022 election.

Arraf placed fourth in a five-way Democratic primary held in August 2022, losing the nomination to Carl Marlinga.

Personal life 
Arraf married Adam Shapiro, another ISM co-founder, in 2002. They met while both were working at the Jerusalem center of Seeds of Peace.

References

1976 births
Activists from Detroit
American activists
American people of Palestinian descent
Candidates in the 2022 United States House of Representatives elections
Living people
Seeds of Peace
University of Michigan College of Literature, Science, and the Arts alumni
Washington College of Law alumni